The white-lored warbler (Myiothlypis conspicillata) is a species of bird in the family Parulidae.
It is endemic to the Santa Marta Mountains in Colombia.

Its natural habitats are subtropical or tropical moist montane forests, plantations, and heavily degraded former forest. It is threatened by habitat loss.

References

white-lored warbler
Birds of the Sierra Nevada de Santa Marta
Endemic birds of Colombia
white-lored warbler
white-lored warbler
white-lored warbler
Taxonomy articles created by Polbot